Mizuhobaris is an extinct genus of shelled octopods from the Late Miocene.

M. lepta was found in the Los Angeles Basin, California. This species is characterised by low radial ribs on a thin, keelless, planispirally coiled eggcase. It represents the first Argonautidae fossil from the Western Hemisphere.

References

Further reading
Yanagisawa, Y. 1990.   Bull. Geol. Surv. Japan 41 (3): 115-127.

Argonautidae
Cephalopod genera